Motorsport Park Hastings is a 2.15 mile long, 40 foot wide road course on the Southeast corner of Hastings, Nebraska. What started out as a dream on a napkin in a local restaurant with a few friends, became a reality in 2006 when renowned track designer Alan Wilson designed this road course.  Construction started in the early spring of 2006 and by fall most of the asphalt were laid, 13 turns as well as 3 long straight-a-ways that allow for speeds of over 100 mph while providing a safe environment with long run-off areas.

The track host various car/motorcycle clubs and events including:

ChampCar Endurance Series
Ducati Omaha/TrackAddix riding school
Great Plains Regions Porsche Club of America
KART MARRS
Mustang Roundup
Nebraska Region SCCA
NASA Central Region
Rocky Mountain Vintage Racing
Viper Rendezvous

In February 2009, Forbes.com named MPH one of the “Best Places to Speed Legally in the United States.”

References

External links 

Buildings and structures in Hastings, Nebraska
Motorsport venues in Nebraska
Tourist attractions in Adams County, Nebraska